Titli is an Indian television drama aired on Star Jalsha. It stars Madhupriya Chowdhury and Aryann Bhowmik in lead roles and Ayendri Lavnia Roy in a negative role. The series was premiered on 13 July 2020 and is produced by Susanta Das. It was produced under Tent Cinema. After airing 416 episodes and running for almost 1 and a half years, the show went off-air on 31 October 2021.

Plot 
Titli follows the journey of a girl. Titli who aspires to become a pilot despite suffering from hearing impairment overcoming all the hurdles she faces. The story starts with Titli's childhood. At the beginning, her choice was to listen to variety of sounds. One day, a plane crashes near her and a dangerous sound of that plane damages her eardrums. Her father takes her to hospital. The doctors say that Titli being alive, has lost the ability to hear. One day, she goes to the crashed plane and takes oath that she will be a pilot. Later in the story, it shows that Titli has grown up. However to achieve her dream she ended up in Kolkata in her father's rich friend Aparesh Bose's house. She will also have to win the heart of every person in the Bose house. But Titli didn't want her deafness to be exposed. She befriends Sunny, a YouTuber and a food blogger, and the youngest son of Aparesh Bose, who also befriends Titli. But the Bose family doesn't approve of their friendship. However, with Rekha (sunny's mother), Sunny and Kinni by her side, Titli has nothing to fear. One day Rehana played a game where she exposed Titli's deafness, which leads to Titli feeling hurt and guilty, and later she starts living with her Uncle, despite Sunny's request. Her friendship with Sunny causes havoc in the Bose house and induces jealousy in Rehana. Hence, Titli tries to distance herself from Sunny, but meanwhile, Sunny starts to deeply fall in love with her and worries for her safety everytime. Titli tries only to focus on her career and not develop feelings for Sunny but the latter doesn't lose touch with her. When Sunny came into her house to look after her, Sunny and Titli spend some time alone together in the house where Titli lives, but the neighbors come and misunderstand the situation, and badly humiliate Titli for spending time alone with a rich boy. To protect their honor, Rekha marries off Sunny and Titli. Titli is meanwhile happy with her married life, having changed her friendship with Sunny into unconditional love, and her future dream. But she has to face Rehana, who loves Sunny and wants to remove Titli from the path, to have a peaceful life. Rehana wants to destroy Titli's dream of becoming a pilot and make her miserable, with the help of her brother Sudipto. However Sunny protects Titli every time and he has also become an obstacle in Rehana's path to destroy Titli.

1 year later
Titli goes abroad for her career and for her eyes treatment. Adrija gets married to Anirban. Titli surprises everyone with her grand entry. Elsewhere, Deep enters the Bose mansion and surprises everyone. When Sunny and Titli was spending some time together locking themselves in their room, Sunny gets romantic with Titli.  Kinni, Adrija and Babli knock the room and warn them from spending time alone in the room. Suddenly, Sunny starts talking about Rehana. Babli tells that Rehana is fine and has changed herself. Sunny gets angry when he hears from Rekha that she loves Titli more than Sunny, Kinni and Deep. Later, Rehana enters the Bose mansion where she is sick and wheel chaired. After the wedding, Rekha and Aparesh sing a duet song. Elsewhere, Titli decides to stay at home and do lead household life instead of going to Delhi. Nobody agrees to Titli's words. That night, Anirban makes Adrija unconscious and wraps her and takes her to Antara's car. When Anirban brings Adrija home, the whole family gets angry on her. On the day of their flight, Titli's legs get injured in bathroom and they stay back. On the Award Ceremony, Anirban faints Chapa and misbehaves with the family, CEO of Airlines company and shows his true colours. Titli privately told Sunny that her leg didn't injure actually but she pretended to do in order to expose Anirban. The family celebrates Sunny's birthday and Titli gifts her earnings to Sunny, so that he can set up his restaurant business. One day, Titli goes to Dehradun, Uttarakhand where the area was flooded. The family hears that Titli being given a warning, did what she wasn't supposed to. Elsewhere, Sunny loses his cool and goes to Uttarakhand. Niladri rescues Titli but he decides to hide Titli's identity. Meanwhile, Titli suffers from amnesia. She starts staying with Niladri and his mother, who is blind. The family later learns that Titli is dead. The whole family breaks down and they perform Titli's last rites. Later it was revealed that Sudipto had killed Titli by pushing her into the flooded water, as per Rahi's plan. Niladri decides to hide Titli's identity, in order to hide his wife Anamika's uncertain death in the floods, as his mother would be unable to bear the news.

2 years later
Titli goes out with Niladri and his mother for a road trip. Titli suddenly gets a vision from her old memories. Elsewhere, Sunny successfully set up his restaurant business, as per Titli's wish, and the family decides to get Rehana and Sunny married. One day, Niladri enters Sunny's restaurant with Titli / Anamika. The whole family gets shocked upon seeing Titli. Sunny becomes desperate. One day, Rehana and Sunny go to Niladri's house to search Titli, but Niladri and Titli suddenly show their marriage pictures and certificates. Sunny still believes her to be Titli. On the wedding night, Titli suddenly enters the Bose mansion and spoils Sunny and Rehana's marriage. Rehana bursts out in anger. Then Sudipto and Niladri discuss regarding Titli's accident. One night, Sunny suddenly comes to Niladri's place and smokes and takes Titli away. Sunny hides her. One day, Kinni suddenly falls sick and Titli, disguised as a maid, goes to Kinni's room and gives her a medicine. That night, Sunny takes her to the pilot training institute and disguises her as a Punjabi man and he takes her to the Bose mansion as Balwinder. One day, Kinni and Pritam portray a drama of argument and she a tries to again pretend to suicide in order to recall Titli's memory but Titli falls unconscious. On the other hand, Sudipto listens the conversation and tells it to Rehana. One night, Sudipto and Rehana faint her and take her somewhere else. Later, everyone gets shocked due to the absence of Balwinder, but Sunny later discloses the truth that she was Anamika and not Balwinder. One day, Niladri brings police in Sunny's place but Niladri and Sunny get into a conflict. Again, he starts talking about Titli but Aparesh decides to lock his room. Sunny escapes from the window of his room and gets Titli. Sunny takes her to the cockpit, and she finally recalls her memory. Titli comes with Sunny to the Bose mansion, but Rekha suddenly announces a shocking demand to Titli that she will give up her dream of pilot, and she sacrifices for Rekha, but fails. One day, she gets humiliated by her in laws where nobody supported her and everything was revealed. She goes with Sunny and faint Niladri and rescue Titli's mother and bring her in Kolkata. Sunny faints and they come to know that he is suffering from a disease and Titli steals all the test reports of Sunny from the hospital. One day, Babli faints upon knowing that she's pregnant and on one night, Sunny goes out of his house and is kidnapped and Nandan, Sunny's imposter who looks exactly like him, stays in the Bose mansion and misbehaves with the Boses and they get shocked on Sunny's behaviour and Shefali keeps eye. Titli and Nandan go out of the house where Sunny meets Titli and Dee and Pritam arrest Nandan. Sunny returns but Titli refuses to believe him to be Sunny. Then Deep and Pritam bring Nandan and everyone gets shocked and the police arrest Shefali. The Boses celebrate Sindoorkhela. The show ends on a happy note where Titli joins as a pilot and Sunny sees her.

Cast

Main

 Madhupriya Chowdhury as
 Titli Bose (née Sanyal) - Sunny's wife, Niladri's namesake wife and Aparesh and Rekha's daughter-in-law, Kakali and Anup's daughter, Kinni and Deep's sister-in-law. She is a pilot by profession. (2020 - 2021)
 Anamika Roychoudhury aka Kotha/Mika (memory loss) (2021)

Shayree Sarkar as Young Titli (2020)

 Aryann Bhowmik as
 Sunny Bose - Titli's husband, Deep and Kinni's younger brother, Aparesh and Rekha's youngest son, Rahi's love interest, Kakali and Anup's son in-law. He is a YouTuber and a food vlogger and a businessman who dreams to make village recipes popular to the world. (2020 - 2021)
Nandan - a terrorist, Sunny's imposter (2021)

Recurring
 Chandraniv Mukherjee as Pritam - Aparesh and Rekha's only son-in-law, Kinni's husband, Deep and Sunny's brother in-law. (2020 - 2021)
 Jayati Chakraborty as Sumitra Bose - Abhi and Mampu's mother, Deep, Kinni and Sunny's younger aunt, Rekha's sister in-law, Anilesh's wife, Anirban's mother in-law. (2020 - 2021)
 Kaushik Bhattacharya as Anilesh Bose - Sumitra's husband, Abhi and Mampu's father, Aparesh's younger brother, Deep, Kinni and Sunny's paternal uncle, Anirban's father in-law. (2020)
 Maitrayee Mitra as Rekha Bose - Deep, Kinni and Sunny's mother, Babli - Pritam - Titli's mother-in-law, Aparesh's wife. (2020 - 2021)
 Kushal Chakraborty as Aparesh Bose - A businessman, Deep, Kinni and Sunny's father, Babli - Pritam - Titli's father-in-law, Rekha's husband, Anup's once friend, Amitava's friend and business partner. (2020 - 2021)
 Rimjhim Mitra as Sunayana Bose (née Mitra) aka Babli - Amitava and Sushmita's elder daughter, Sudipto and Rahi's elder sister, Aparesh - Rekha's eldest daughter in-law, Sunny and  Kinni's elder sister in-law, Deep's wife. (2020 - 2021)
 Rajiv Bose as Deepayan Bose aka Deep - Amitava and Sushmita's elder son in-law, Aparesh and Rekha's eldest son, Sunny and Kinni's elder brother, Titli, Pritam, Rahi, Sudipto's elder brother in-law, Babli's husband. (2020 - 2021)
 Misty Singh as Kinni - Aparesh and Rekha's only daughter, Pritam's wife, Deep and Sunny's only sister. Babli and Titli's sister in-law and Titli's well-wisher. (2020 - 2021)
 Nandini Dutta as Adrija Roy (née Bose) aka Mampu - Sumitra's daughter, Deep, Kinni and Sunny's younger cousin sister, Anirban's wife.(2020 - 2021) 
 Pritam Dey as Abhijeet Bose aka Abhi - Son of Anilesh and Sumitra, Sunny, Kinni and Deep's cousin brother. (2020 - 2021)
 Himika Patra as Chapa - the care taker of the Bose family (2020 - 2021)
Shankar Chakraborty / Anindo Sarkar as Anup Sanyal - Titli's father, Sunny's father-in-law, Aparesh's onece friend, Kakali's husband, a terrorist. (2020)/(2021) 
Sonali Patra / Ivana Dutta as Kakali Sanyal - Titli's mother, Sunny's mother in-law, Anup's wife. (2020)/(2021)
Ayendri Lavnia Roy as Rehana Mitra aka Rahi - Amitava and Sushmita's younger daughter, Babli and Sudipto's younger sister, Deep's sister in law, Sunny's financee, Titli's rival. She pretended to act nice with the Boses when she was wheelchair bounded and changed herself into rival after pushing Titli in the flood. (2020 - 2021)
 Souvik Banerjee as Niladri Roy Chowdhury aka Neel, a terrorist. (2021)
 Kaushiki Guha as Niladri's mother (2021) 
Aritra Dutta as Sudipto Mitra - Amitava and Sushmita's only son, Babli and Rahi's only brother, Deep's brother in-law, Titli's molester and Sunny's arch rival. (2020 - 2021)
Arindam Banerjee as Amitava Mitra - Sushmita's husband,  Babli, Sudipto and Rahi's father, Deep's father in-law, an industrialist. He was Aparesh's business partner and friend. (2020 - 2021)
Nibedita Mukherjee / Abanti Dutta as Sushmita Mitra - Amitava's wife, Babli, Sudipto and Rahi's mother, Deep's mother-in-law. (2020)/(2021)
Sudip Sarkar as Sounak Roy / Anirban Sen - Mampu's husband, Sumitra and Anilesh's son in-law, a terrorist. (2021)
 Anindya Chakraborty as Debasish - Titli's uncle in-law, Sunny's uncle, Gargi's (Sunny's paternal aunt) husband, a pilot. (2020)
 Aritram Mukherjee as Rajib Chowdhury - Sudipto's cunning friend, Titli, Sunny and Kinni's enemy, Kinni's ex-boyfriend. (2020)
Shaoni Roy as Pritam's sister (2021)

Production
The first promo of the series was released on 6 March 2020. Speaking about the series Susanta Das said, "Titli embodies the spirit of those innumerable women who dare to make their dreams a reality".

References

External links 
 Titli on Disney+ Hotstar

Bengali-language television programming in India
2020 Indian television series debuts
2021 Indian television series endings
Star Jalsha original programming